Gerrit Augustinus Siwabessy (19 August 1914 – 11 November 1982) was an Indonesian politician who served as the ninth minister of health from July 1966 until March 1978, during the presidencies of Sukarno and Suharto.

Early life

Gerrit Augustinus Siwabessy was born to clove farmers Enoch Siwabessy and Naatje Manuhutu in Saparua, a small island in central Maluku within the vicinity of Ambon. Enoch Siwabessy died when his son was one year old; his widow then married Jacob Leuwol, an elementary school teacher. Because Leuwol was a teacher, Siwabessy and his family enjoyed a higher social status on par with pastors and priests while he attended elementary and middle school. G.A. Siwabessy graduated from high school (MULO) in Kota Ambon in 1931, where his grades were high enough to earn a scholarship funded by the government of the Dutch East Indies to NIAS (Dutch Indies Medical School) in Surabaya on Java. He studied alongside a highly multiethnic body of Indonesian students that, among others, included Ibnu Sutowo; this exposure to multiculturalism shaped his perspective to include Ambonese matters with respect to the nation at large where he had previously only considered Ambon in itself.

During Siwabessy's first years as an undergraduate, he attended a conference of the local Studenten Vereniging Christen (Christian Student Association) which took place in Kaliurang, a small town within the vicinity of Yogyakarta. His experiences helped him form ideas about how to design an Ambonese-oriented version of the association. Alongside Jo Picauly, a fellow medical student in Jakarta, Siwabessy created the Vereniging Ambonsche Studenten (VAS; Association of Ambonese Students) with two chapters; he led the VAS chapter in Surabaya. However, because not many Ambonese resided in Surabaya at the time, the club held little more than minor festivities. During the later years of his studies, Siwabessy created a more substantial organisation called Memadjoekan Cultuur Maloekoe, or MCM (Advancement of the Moluccan Culture), in 1938. The premise of the association was to provide a means of cultural unity for Moluccan students experiencing "a nomadic nostalgia, an urge for identity or personality".

Suharto era

In 1965, several military officials comprising the September 30 Movement attempted a coup that led to the kidnappings and assassinations of major army officials (including Minister of the Army Achmad Yani), a leadership vacuum existed in the Army Headquarters. President Sukarno chose Major General Suharto to launch operations against the 30 September Movement. Suharto's success in these measures led Sukarno to broaden the scope of Suharto's measures in handling security, formalised with the creation of Kopkamtib (Operational Command for the Restoration of Security and Order). Suharto, now the leader of Indonesia's army, gradually siphoned Sukarno's power towards himself, an action emphasised with the passing of the Supersemar decree. At the time, which was between June 1966 and May 1967, G.A. Siwabessy engaged in an "internal cleansing operation" to remove all elements of the PKI from the Ministry of Health and ensure that all of the officials and employees within the Ministry adhered to Suharto's Pancasila ideology. Siwabessy performed these cleansings so effectively that Suharto allowed him to retain the position of Minister of Health in the wake of the turmoil of Suharto's newfound presidency.

Once Suharto was officially recognised as president, Siwabessy was tasked with rebuilding Indonesian relations with international health organisations. The Minister met with members of the United Nations, an organisation that Indonesia had joined in 1967. Siwabessy coordinated with UNICEF to establish an Applied Nutrition Program in Indonesia, training people in the nutritional sciences by means of both Indonesian and American experts. He also worked with the World Health Organization with the intention of eradicating infectious diseases rampant in the country, and joined Indonesia to the Smallpox Global Eradication Programme in 1967. Siwabessy launched a campaign that actively fought smallpox two years later, and systematically 
eradicated it from Indonesia over the six following years. The World Health Organization recognised G.A. Siwabessy in 1974 for his successes.

Using foreign funds, G.A. Siwabessy modernised a series of medical facilities, prompting the construction of a medical laboratory at Hasan Sadikin Hospital in Bandung; the introduction of intensive care units at Dr. Cipto Mangunkusumo Hospital in Jakarta and in the Floating Hospital in Maluku; and the modernisation of facilities and equipment at hospitals in Semarang and Navan. Siwabessy also began developing the concept of puskesmas, a community health centre that would become prominent in Indonesia's rural regions. Between 22 and 29 April 1968, Siwabessy held the Rapat Kerja Kesehatan Nasional (English: National Healthcare Meeting) that yielded designs for Repelita (Indonesian: Rencana Pembangunan Lima Tahun; English: Five-Year Development Plan) that was to be first applied to healthcare in Indonesia. Siwabessy commissioned the creation of a special planning committee led by Sulianti Saroso and created education programs at the National Health Institute in Surabaya and at the Health Development Agency in Jakarta to train people to plan in the context of applying development to solve healthcare issues. He arranged for employees of the Ministry of Health and local governments to study abroad. One month after the health conference, Suharto replaced the Sukarno-era Ampera Cabinet with the Development Cabinet. G.A. Siwabessy was reappointed Minister of Health in the first of Suharto's cabinets. Before the events associated with Repelita I ended, Suharto was re-elected as president in 1972. He appointed Siwabessy to office for a third term between 1973 and 1978.

In 1975, Siwabessy initiated Repelita II. Having developed the skilled labour necessary during the first Repelita, the second aimed to eradicated infectious diseases, enact stricter drug and food control laws, establish health education programs, improve the nutrition of Indonesia's residents, augment Indonesia's physical infrastructure, and further train and more efficiently use health personnel in the country. Under Repelita II, puskesmas (health clinics) and other health centres were constructed all across Indonesia. The development of the Samijaga program (Indonesian: Sarana Air Minum dan Jamban Keluarga, English: Drinking Water and Family Lavatories) led to widespread accessibility to water uncontaminated by feces. Together, the Repelita programs and Samijaga demonstrated Siwabessy's ability to create and successfully implement policies on health, earning him an award from the World Health Organization.

Awards and recognition

G.A. Siwabessy garnered a reputation as the "Father of the Atom" (Indonesian: Bapak Atom), for his work in radiology, and was awarded the Bintang Mahaputera Utama—the third order of the most prestigious award an Indonesian civilian can receive—by the government of Indonesia. A nuclear reactor in Tangerang is named for him.

References

Bibliography

1914 births
1982 deaths
People from Saparua
Government ministers of Indonesia